Jonnikin and the Flying Basket: French Folk and Fairy Tales is a 1969 anthology of 17 French tales that have been collected and retold by Ruth Manning-Sanders. It is one in a long series of such anthologies by Manning-Sanders.

Table of contents
The Gold Dragoon
Jonnikin and the Flying Basket
The Antmolly Birds
The King of the Crows
The Night of Four Times
The Little Milleress
The Thirteen Flies
The Handsome Apprentice
The Small Men and the Weaver
Tam and Tessa
The Snake Monster
The Young Shepherd
The Prince of the Seven Golden Cows
The Sword of the Stone
The Son of the King of Spain
The Magic Wand
The Nine White Sheep

See also

French mythology
Manning-Sanders tales from France

1969 short story collections
1969 children's books
Collections of fairy tales
Children's short story collections
British children's books
French fairy tales
1969 anthologies